Ballina is a town in north County Mayo, Ireland. It lies at the mouth of the River Moy near Killala Bay, in the Moy valley and Parish of Kilmoremoy, with the Ox Mountains to the east and the Nephin Beg mountains to the west. The town occupies two baronies; Tirawley on the west bank of the Moy River, and Tireragh, a barony within the County of Sligo, on its east banks. , the population of Ballina was 10,171.

History
According to Encyclopædia Britannica, the first signs of settlement on the site of the town date from around 1375 when an Augustinian friary was founded. Belleek, now part of the town, pre-dates the town's formation, and can be dated back to the 16th century. Ballina was founded as a garrison town in 1723 by O'Hara, Lord Tyrawley. Belleek Castle was built some time later, between 1825 and 1831.

Pre-history
The Dolmen of the Four Maols is located on 'Primrose Hill' behind Ballina's Railway Station. This Bronze Age cist is sometimes dated to c2,000 B.C. and is locally known as the 'Table of the Giants'. Legend suggests that the dolmen is the burial place of the four Maols. The four Maols murdered Ceallach, a 7th-century Bishop of Kilmoremoy and were quartered at Ardnaree – the Hill of Executions. Tradition says that their bodies were buried under the dolmen.

Belleek
The Belleek demesne once stretched for over three kilometres along the left bank of the Moy estuary, from the gate lodge on Castle Road as far as Knockatinnole Wood in the north. From here the demesne extended westward to the Killala Road where there was a secondary entrance at a place known as "The Black Woods". During the Irish Rebellion of 1798, a small column of French soldiers advanced through the estate, as part of a reconnaissance group. This gave title to the avenue known as "The Old French Road". Today, the centerpiece of the estate is Belleek Manor (Belleek Castle Hotel) which was constructed between 1825-1831 for Lieut-Col Sir Francis Arthur Knox-Gore, a former Lord-Lieutenant of County Sligo, to designs attributed to the Irish architect John Benjamin Keane. Belleek remained within the ownership of the Knox-Gore family until 1942, when it was sold by William Arthur Cecil Saunders-Knox-Gore (1888-1975) due to mounting costs and rates.

Ardnaree
The River Moy forms the traditional county border between Mayo and Sligo. However, the Local Government (Ireland) Act 1898 made the right (east) bank of the Moy, including Ardnaree and Crockets Town (the Quay), part of the administrative county of Mayo. This is a suburb of Ballina. The Battle of Ardnaree was fought there in 1586. Ardnaree Sarsfields GFC is based there.

1798 rebellion

A centenary memorial (known as the Humbert Monument) was dedicated on 11 May 1898 to commemorate the 100th anniversary of the French landing at Killala in support of the 1798 rebellion. The monument was originally sculptured by a Dublin craftsman but subsequently restored locally. The figure on the monument is not Humbert but Mother Ireland. Maud Gonne unveiled the monument, and at the unveiling event famously poured water over another speaker's (an IRB member) head. The monument was moved to its current location on Humbert Street in 1987, where it was re-dedicated by Maud Gonne's son, Seán MacBride.

Great famine 
In the first half of the 19th century, the rural areas around Ballina were heavily dependent on the potato as a primary source of food. When a potato blight struck in 1846, widespread starvation occurred. The Ballina workhouse served the entire northwestern coast of Mayo. As the famine took hold in the rural areas, huge numbers of starving peasants requested admission to the overcrowded facility. In February 1847 people were dying of fever at the rate of almost ninety persons a week. There were attempts at mitigating the crisis by some local citizens. Francis Kinkead, the Church of Ireland curate in Ballina, who came to Ballina in 1837 and died on 27 January 1847, played a role in organising funds to help relieve the suffering of both the Catholic and Protestant populations. A marble memorial tablet on the wall of the Church of Ireland in Ballina is dedicated to Kinkead.

Irish language 
From its foundation until the early 1900s, the Irish language was the primary language spoken in Ballina. As Irish began to decline in other parts of Ireland during the colonial period, it remained strong in County Mayo and in Ballina. By the 1920s, however, English had become the dominant language in Ballina. In the 1926 Ordnance Survey it was found that although many adults in Ballina had Irish as a first language, it was no longer known by young people or used in the community. Ballina was one of the only parts of County Mayo not designated status as a Gaeltacht or 'Breac-Ghaeltacht,' a status given in 1929 to regions where more than 80% or 25% respectively of people spoke Irish as a first language.

Ballina and Westport were among the first urban areas in County Mayo to adopt the English language. Records from the surrounding then Irish-speaking rural areas in Mayo and in neighbouring County Sligo suggest that Irish-speakers from those areas felt pressure to use English when in Ballina. Today only Ceathrú Thaidhg, 70 km to the west of Ballina remains a majority Irish-speaking area in County Mayo.

Architecture, planning, and housing

The town's architectural heritage includes the 15th-century Moyne Abbey, and St Muredach's Cathedral, which is the Cathedral Church of the Roman Catholic Diocese of Killala. Work on the cathedral began in 1827. The stone was quarried locally and the roof and ceiling were completed before the Great Famine (1845). The spire was completed in 1855 and by 1875 the organ had been commissioned.

Ballina has a number of listed buildings including Georgian housing on the banks of the Moy, the Ice House building (since converted into a hotel), and the former provincial bank (now housing the Jackie Clarke Museum). The streets of Ballina consist mainly of three and four-storey Georgian and Victorian buildings, though the structures of several buildings are far older.

Infrastructure

Education
The primary schools that serve the town include Scoil Iosa of the Convent of Mercy (mixed), Scoil Padraig (all-boys), the Quay NS (mixed), Culleens NS on the Killala Road (mixed), Breaffy NS (mixed), Behy NS (mixed) and Scoil na gCeithre Maol (mixed), a gaelscoil situated on the Killala road. There are also at least 3 Montessori schools and many pre-schools.

There are three secondary schools; St Muredach's College (all-male), Moyne College (mixed), and St Marys of the Convent of Mercy (all-female).

A large, modern facility opened on McDermott Street (convent road) for the 2009–2010 school year to serve the needs of children with mild learning disabilities. It is an amalgamation of the 2 old special needs schools, St. Dympna's and St. Nicholas'.

The Newman Institute of education is located in a new campus on Abbey St. It is a charitable organisation working in conjunction with the Catholic Diocese of Killala in the field of Catholic education.

Communications and media
Ballina is one of the towns due to have a MAN (Metropolitan Area Network): the ductings and fiber optic cables are in place, but with no ISP Connections. The MANs are being built for the Department of Communications; they will be run by a private operator, but will remain the property of the government.

Local media

BCRfm (Ballina Community Radio) is the community radio station in the town. The Western People is a local newspaper based in Ballina and until recently was also printed at its premises in the town. It is owned by the Cork-based Thomas Crosbie Holdings. Two weekly freesheets, the Mayo Advertiser and The Northwest Express are distributed throughout Ballina. There is also a monthly magazine called Mayo Now that was launched in March 2015 and previously a monthly magazine called "INK" that was in circulation since Feb 2011. The Connaught Telegraph, published in Castlebar, and the Mayo News, published in Westport, also carry local news related to Ballina, though are less popular. Mid West Radio is the local station, with an office in the town. An online news service, MayoToday.ie, also carries news and information related to Ballina.

Historically there has been a number of newspapers directly linked with the town, these include:

 Ballina Advertiser, Mayo And Sligo Commercial Gazette (10 Jan 1840 – 10 November 1843)
 Ballina Chronicle (2 May 1849 – 14 August 1851; M/W Connaught Watchman)
 Ballina Herald (1844 – Oct 1961; C/A 'Ballina Herald and Mayo and Sligo Advertiser')
 Ballina Herald and Mayo and Sligo Advertiser (Oct 1891 – 28 April 1962; M/W 'Western People')
 Ballina Impartial, or Tyrawly Advertiser (13 Jan 1823 – 16 November 1835)
 Ballina Journal and Connaught Advertiser (C/A 1880 – 11 March 1895)
 Connaught Watchman (2 Aug 1851 – 3 October 1863)
 Mayo Now Magazine Launched March 2015
 INK Magazine – (Feb 2011 – present)
 Tyrawly Herald; or Mayo and Sligo Intelligencer (1844–1870)
 Western Gem (1843)
 Western Journal (1977 – 15 February 1980; C/A Sligo Journal 22 February 1980 – 11 March 1983)
 Western People (1883 – present) 
 Western Star (1835–1837)

[ M/W = merged with; C/A = continued as |Source: National Library of Ireland ]

Throughout the 1980s Ballina had a number of local stations before the advent of legalised local radio in 1989.

The stations included: ARW – Alternative Radio West, which operated from Lord Edward Street, Castle Radio – which was based in Belleek Castle, Westward Radio – broadcast from Howley Street (Later Teeling St), Holiday FM and TCR both of which were based on Tone Street.

Transport links

Roads 
The N26 is the main road to Dublin: it leaves the town south to Foxford, and after Swinford joins the N5 to Dublin. N59 comes from Belmullet and Crossmolina in the west, and goes through the town to Sligo to the northeast. The R314 is a regional road to Killala, and then Ballycastle. The R294 goes to south County Sligo via 'the Windy Gap' in the Ox Mountains. It is used as an alternative route to Dublin, via Tubbercurry and Boyle.

Bridges 
There are two main bridges straddling the Moy in the town centre. The first, the Armstrong and West, or Lower bridge, was built in 1835. The second, the Hamm bridge or Upper bridge, was built in the following year of 1836 by Thomas Hamm at a cost of £3,000.00. Both bridges are limestone, and have 4 and 5 arches respectively. Traffic flows in a one-way direction around these 2 bridges and is often heavily backed up on both sides, the reason for calls for a third bridge further down the river.

The Salmon Weir Bridge is a pedestrian bridge over the River Moy from Barrett St. to Ridge Pool Rd. The bridge, which was designed to resemble a fishing rod, was opened in July 2009.

Bus 
Ballina Bus Station is host to a Bus Éireann bus depot. Bus Éireann have stated that they intend to develop services similar to the 24-hour Dublin-Belfast route on the Ballina-Dublin route. The route currently runs seven services a day between Ballina and the capital. In 2007 Bus Éireann launched a direct bus from Dublin Airport to Ballina.
A Ballina to Enniscrone bus is run by several companies during the summer months.

Rail 
Ballina railway station is located on the N26 beside the bus station. Departing trains stop at Foxford before terminating at Manulla junction where passengers can connect to trains going to Castlebar, Westport or Dublin (Heuston Station). Trains to Dublin operate three times daily and on Friday evenings a train operates direct from Dublin to Ballina.
Ballina is a major rail freight hub, with a direct freight line from the town to Waterford Port transporting pulpwood for Coillte, and as of late 2009, a direct Dublin Port line. This new line is used to transport containers of Coca-Cola concentrate from the town's plant, removing almost 4,000 trucks off Irish roads. It was suggested in the McCarthy Report the line from the Manulla junction to Ballina be closed, resulting in the loss of these freight lines. However CIÉ has since stated that it has absolutely no intention to close this line, which it said is the only profitable freight line in the country.

Air 
Ireland West Airport Knock (Knock Airport, NOC) is about 50.7 km, or 31.5 miles from Ballina. Bus Éireann now runs a shuttle service about five times a day from the airport to Charlestown, from where commuters can get a connecting bus to Ballina.

Social life and culture
Ballina's entertainment scene is supported by a number of traditional pubs, late bars and a variety of restaurants.

The Old Newman Institute building on Barrett Street is home to the Ballina Arts Centre, which was redeveloped to incorporate a new auditorium, dance studio, rehearsal space, exhibition gallery and coffee shop between 2009 and 2011.

In 2009 the Jackie Clarke Collection went on display when the Clarke Museum opened in the old provincial bank. During his lifetime Jackie Clarke sourced and purchased many unique documents that scholars had believed to be lost, including sole surviving copies of publications, rare handbills and proclamations, unpublished manuscripts and political writings. He donated all his collections to the state, under the condition they would stay in Ballina.

Tourism, sports and events

Tourism
Ballina's location on the River Moy favours salmon fishing, and one of the best spots, the Ridge Pool, is situated in the heart of the town. The Ballina Salmon Festival is held annually in July in the town. The festival includes Heritage Day, where most of the centre of the town is closed to traffic and the streets fill with arts and craft stalls and demonstrations of transport from days gone by. The festival finale is a Mardi Gras followed by a monster fireworks display

Tourist attractions include two museums in the town, the Jackie Clarke Collection and Belleek Castle Museum.

Sport
Ballina Stephenites, is one of the local Gaelic Athletic Association club teams. The name also refers to the town's Gaelic Athletic Association grounds, James Stephens Park.

Ballina Town and Ballina United are two of the town's soccer clubs, the former playing their home matches at Belleek Park. Ballina R.F.C. is located in the Quay and compete in division 2B of the All Ireland League.

Ballina's athletics club has a floodlight outdoor 400m track and a large cross country pitch which often holds the AAI Connacht and Mayo finals. The local triathlon club Liquid Motion holds a triathlon in the town every summer, usually in July to coincide with The Ballina Street and Arts festival.

In basketball, Team Loftus Recycling represent the town in Men's Division 1. Ballina also has Mayo's only Gymnastics Training Centre, Nadia Gym. The town also has a martial arts school, Moy Valley Freestyle, and a Jikishin Kage-ryu kenjutsu club.

Ballina Golf Club is an 18-hole parkland golf course on the outskirts of the town on the Bonniconlon Road. The course is a Par 71 course, 5933 metres (6488 yards) long.

A short lived greyhound racing track was opened by the Ballina Greyhound Racing Company Ltd in the town on 6 May 1948. The site near Coolcran farm was replaced by the Dunleavy cattle farm market in 1956.

Notable people
 Tibbot MacWalter Kittagh Bourke, 17th century Irish lord
 Dara Calleary, politician
 Jack Charlton, owned a holiday home in Ballina
 Gavin Duffy, former rugby player
 Ray Foley, radio DJ
 Michael Gaughan, Irish Republican Army hunger striker
 Michelle Mulherin, politician
 Peter Quinn, Gaelic footballer
 Mary Robinson, President of Ireland from 1990–1997
 Sarah Rowe, sportsperson
 William E. Shannon, American politician; born in Ballina
 Edward Whelan, Canadian politician; born in Ballina

Twin towns
Ballina is twinned with:
Craigavon, Northern Ireland, United Kingdom
Athis-Mons, Île-de-France, France
Pittsfield, Massachusetts, United States
Scranton, Pennsylvania, United States
Ballina, New South Wales, Australia

Gallery

See also
 List of towns and villages in Ireland
 Céide Fields
 Rappa Castle
 Wild Atlantic Way

References

External links

 Ballina Town Council Archived here
 Ballina Tourist Office & Ballina Chamber of Commerce

 
1375 establishments in Ireland
Towns and villages in County Mayo